Heather Monro (born 4 September 1971) was the second British female orienteer to win a world championship medal. She came 5th at the World Orienteering Championships in 2001. At the 2003 World Orienteering Championships she was the highest placed British Female coming Fourteenth place over the 11.8 km race. At the 2005 World Orienteering Championships she took the bronze medal in the sprint distance. She also came third at the World Games in the same year.

One of Heather's most notable victories came in the 2003 O-Ringen. She has also won the British Orienteering Championships in all four individual disciplines, the only woman to do so, and has won the JK Orienteering Festival 5 times, as well as winning the inaugural JK Sprint.

She runs for South London Orienteers and Halden SK in  Norway. She is a member of the British Athletes Commission (BAC) executive committee.

Notes

References

External links
 
 

1971 births
Living people
British orienteers
Female orienteers
Foot orienteers
World Orienteering Championships medalists
World Games bronze medalists
Competitors at the 2001 World Games
Competitors at the 2005 World Games
World Games medalists in orienteering